Major-General Henry Edward Manning Douglas  (11 July 1875 – 14 February 1939) was an English recipient of the Victoria Cross, the highest and most prestigious award for gallantry in the face of the enemy that can be awarded to British and Commonwealth forces.

Biography
Born in Gillingham, Medway, Douglas took the Scottish Triple Qualification (LRCP(Edin), LRCS(Edin), LRCPS(Glas) in 1898. He was commissioned as a lieutenant in the Royal Army Medical Corps on 28 July 1899, and travelled to South Africa following the outbreak of the Second Boer War three months later.

Douglas was 24 years old, and a lieutenant in the Royal Army Medical Corps during the Second Boer War, when the following deed earned him the Victoria Cross at the Battle of Magersfontein, South Africa, on 11 December 1899:

Douglas was himself wounded by a bullet in the face at Magersfontein, and was invalided back home. He returned to South Africa only two months later, however, leaving Southampton in the SS Ottoman in late February 1900, and continued to serve until he returned to the United Kingdom in early 1901. He received the VC from King Edward VII during an investiture at Marlborough House on 25 July 1901. The following year he was appointed for light duty in the Home District, and promoted to captain on 28 July 1902.

He also served in the First World War and later achieved the rank of Major General. In October 1914, the Duchess of Wellington’s Hospital was opened at the Casino at La Touquet with a staff of sixty orderlies, nineteen Bart’s nurses and four qualified dressers.  The chief surgeon was Major (later Sir) Charles Watson FRCS assisted by five Medical Officers.  Its commandant was Major HEM Douglas RAMC, VC, DSO.  

He is buried in Epsom. His Victoria Cross is displayed at the Army Medical Services Museum in Aldershot, England.

References

Monuments to Courage (David Harvey, 1999)
The Register of the Victoria Cross (This England, 1997)
Victoria Crosses of the Anglo-Boer War (Ian Uys, 2000)

External links
Location of grave and VC medal (Surrey)
Anglo-Boer War biography

1875 births
1939 deaths
People from Gillingham, Kent
British Army major generals
Second Boer War recipients of the Victoria Cross
British recipients of the Victoria Cross
Companions of the Order of St Michael and St George
Companions of the Order of the Bath
Companions of the Distinguished Service Order
Royal Army Medical Corps officers
British Army personnel of World War I
Recipients of the Croix de Guerre 1914–1918 (France)
British Army personnel of the Second Boer War
British military personnel of the Third Somaliland Expedition
British Army recipients of the Victoria Cross
British Army personnel of the Russian Civil War
People of the Balkan Wars
Recipients of the Order of St. Sava
Explorers of China
Alumni of the University of Edinburgh
Military personnel from Kent